is a railway station on the Seibu Ikebukuro Line in Nerima, Tokyo, Japan, operated by the private railway operator Seibu Railway.

Lines
Only all-stations "Local" services stop at this station.

Station layout

Ekoda Station consists of two side platforms serving two tracks. The platforms are capable of handling 10-car trains.

Platforms

History

The station opened on 1 November 1922.

Renovation of the station building began in 2008 and was completed in 2011.

Station numbering was introduced during fiscal 2012, with Ekoda Station becoming "SI04".

Passenger statistics
In fiscal 2013, the station was the 28th busiest on the Seibu network with an average of 34,045 passengers daily.
The passenger figures for previous years are as shown below.

Surrounding area
Several university and college campuses are located nearby the station.
 Musashi University 
 Musashino Academia Musicae
 College of Art, Nihon University

See also
 List of railway stations in Japan

References

External links

 Ekoda Station information 

 

Seibu Ikebukuro Line
Stations of Seibu Railway
Railway stations in Japan opened in 1922
Railway stations in Tokyo